Talamone Lighthouse is an active lighthouse, located on the southern tip of the rocky promontory of Talamone in the Tuscan Maremma on the Tyrrhenian Sea.

Description
The tower is attached to the southern seaside bastion of the fortress built by Aldobrandeschi in the 13th century. The white lantern is placed on the top of the tower and the lantern roof is painted grey metallic.

The lighthouse is completely automated and managed by Marina Militare with the identification code number 2140 E.F.; the former keeper's house has been given in use to the Circolo della Vela Talamone.

See also
 List of lighthouses in Italy

References

External links
 Servizio Fari Marina Militare

Lighthouses in Tuscany
Orbetello
Lighthouses in Italy